Auburn Theological Seminary, located in New York City, teaches students about progressive social issues by offering workshops, providing consulting, and conducting research on faith leadership development.

The seminary was established in Auburn, New York, in 1818 to prepare young ministers for the frontier. In 1939, weakened by the Great Depression, the seminary relocated from Auburn to the Union Theological Seminary's campus in New York City, although it maintained its independence from Union Theological Seminary. In 2014, it designed and moved to a new leadership development lab in The Interchurch Center in Morningside Heights, Manhattan, New York City.

Auburn Theological Seminary houses a research center focused on the study of seminaries, divinity schools, and the preparation of faith leaders working for social justice.

It was one of the first seminaries in the country to admit African Americans (Moses A. Hopkins, 1877), Japanese (Naoomi Tamura, 1882) and later, female seminarians (Ida Thorne Parker, 1917).

History
Auburn Theological Seminary was established in Auburn, New York, by action of the Presbyterian Synod of Geneva on 16 August 1818. It obtained a charter from the New York State legislature on 14 April 1820 as a post-baccalaureate theological seminary, and it matriculated its first students in 1821. From its inception, the seminary drew support from beyond the Presbyterian Church. Its charter stipulated that "no student of any Christian denomination shall be excluded," and the first class of eleven students represented eight denominations. The Roman Catholic bishop from Boston, Bishop Chevereux, donated books for the school's library.

The school's founders and early faculty (Dirck Lansing, Matthew Perrine, and Henry Mills) rejected sterner forms of Calvinism and advocated for flexible church governance within the Presbyterian Church. These beliefs became known as the Auburn Declaration of 1837.

Under the presidency of George Black Stewart (1899–1926), the school grew to 105 students and eleven faculty. A Summer School of Theology for clergy and laity was established in 1911, and a School of Religious Education in 1921.

Auburn Theological Seminary's faculty, led by Robert Hastings Nichols, professor of church history, played a key role in what became known as the Auburn Affirmation, adopted in 1924, which defended theological freedom and prevented a fundamentalist takeover of the Presbyterian Church.

The Great Depression left Auburn Seminary with a diminished student body and strained resources. The faculty and President Paul Silas Heath (1936–1939) began conversations with several seminaries about possibly relocating. In 1939, it closed its Auburn campus and at the invitation of President Henry Sloan Coffin, moved to the campus of Union Theological Seminary in New York City, although it maintained its board of trustees and endowment.

With the move to Union Theological Seminary, Auburn Theological Seminary ceased granting degrees, instead developing new initiatives: a Program of Training for Rural Ministry in 1944, which continued its emphasis on preparing individuals for the practice of ministry, not for theological specialization; in 1964 the Center for Continuing Education was established as well as the Experimental Program for the Practice of Christian Ministry; in 1968 Auburn Studies in Theological Education was begun; in 1971 the Susquehanna Valley Project to support local ministers started; in 1985 interreligious programs for faith leaders were developed and in 1991 The Center for the Study of Theological Education was established.

Katharine Rhodes Henderson was inaugurated as president in 2009, shifting the institution's focus toward training and supporting faith leaders who work in progressive justice organizations and movements. Auburn's signature programs include: media training, Auburn Senior Fellows, Sojourner Truth Leadership Circle, digital organizing, coaching for faith leaders, and entrepreneurial ministry. Auburn Research explores the needs of theological institutions, their leaders and students, and the ways in which leaders of faith and moral courage are affecting positive social change in society.

Presidents of Auburn Theological Seminary

 Henry Matthias Booth (1893–1899)
 George Black Stewart (1899–1926)
 Harry Lathrop Reed (1926–1936)
 Paul Silas Heath (1936–1939)
 Walter S. Davison, Executive Director (1939–1944)
 Henry Sloan Coffin, Union and Auburn Seminary president (1944–1945)
 Henry P. Van Dusen, Union and Auburn Seminary president (1945–1964)
 Robert Lynn, Dean (?–1976)
 Barbara G. Wheeler, President (1980–2009)
 Katharine Rhodes Henderson (2009–2021)
 Emma Jordan-Simpson (2021–present)

Notable alumni
 Maltbie Davenport Babcock (1858–1901)
 Dwight Baldwin (1798–1886)
 David Riddle Breed (1848–1931)
 Henry Roe Cloud (1884–1950) 
 Titus Coan (1801–1881)
 Sheldon Dibble (1809–1845)
 Justus Doolittle (1824–1880)
 Josiah Bushnell Grinnell (1821–1891)
 Charles Frederic Goss (1852-1930)
 Laurentine Hamilton (1826–1882)
 Joel T. Headley (1813–1897)
 Moses A. Hopkins (1846–1886)
 Herrick Johnson (1832–1913)
 George William Knox (1853–1912)
 Lorenzo Lyons (1807–1886)
 Isaac J. Rice (1808–1880) 
 Edward Payson Roe (1838–1888)
 Boon Tuan Boon-Itt (1865–1903), an early leader in the Protestant Christian community of Thailand

Notable faculty

 James A. Forbes (born 1935)
 Laurens Perseus Hickok (1798–1888)
 William Greenough Thayer Shedd (1820–1894)
 Walter Wink

References

1821 establishments in New York (state)
Educational institutions established in 1821
Presbyterian universities and colleges in the United States
Presbyterianism in New York (state)